German submarine U-2333 was a Type XXIII U-boat of Nazi Germany's Kriegsmarine during World War II. She was ordered on 7 July 1944, and was laid down on 27 September 1944 at Friedrich Krupp Germaniawerft AG, Kiel, as yard number 942. She was launched on 16 November 1944 and commissioned under the command of Oberleutnant zur See Heinz Baumann on 18 December 1944.

Design
Like all Type XXIII U-boats, U-2333 had a displacement of  when at the surface and  while submerged. The submarine was powered by one MWM six-cylinder RS134S diesel engine providing , one AEG GU4463-8 double-acting electric motor electric motor providing , and one BBC silent running CCR188 electric motor providing .

U-2333 was fitted with two  torpedo tubes in the bow. She could carry two preloaded torpedoes. The complement was 14–18 men. This class of U-boat did not carry a deck gun.

Service history
On 5 May 1945, U-2333 was scuttled in Gelting Bay near Gelting as part of Operation Regenbogen. The wreck was later raised and broken up.

See also
 Battle of the Atlantic

References

Bibliography

External links

U-boats commissioned in 1944
World War II submarines of Germany
1944 ships
Type XXIII submarines
Ships built in Kiel
Operation Regenbogen (U-boat)
Maritime incidents in May 1945